Pairing-based cryptography is the use of a pairing between elements of two cryptographic groups to a third group with a mapping  to construct or analyze cryptographic systems.

Definition
The following definition is commonly used in most academic papers.

Let  be a Finite field over prime ,  two additive cyclic groups of prime order  and  another cyclic group of order  written multiplicatively. A pairing is a map: ,  which satisfies the following properties:
 Bilinearity 
 Non-degeneracy 
 Computability There exists an efficient algorithm to compute .

Classification 
If the same group is used for the first two groups (i.e. ), the pairing is called symmetric and is a mapping from two elements of one group to an element from a second group.

Some researchers classify pairing instantiations into three (or more) basic types:
 ;
  but there is an efficiently computable homomorphism ;

Usage in cryptography
If symmetric, pairings can be used to reduce a hard problem in one group to a different, usually easier problem in another group.

For example, in groups equipped with a bilinear mapping such as the Weil pairing or Tate pairing, generalizations of the computational Diffie–Hellman problem are believed to be infeasible while the simpler decisional Diffie–Hellman problem can be easily solved using the pairing function. The first group is sometimes referred to as a Gap Group because of the assumed difference in difficulty between these two problems in the group.

While first used for cryptanalysis, pairings have also been used to construct many cryptographic systems for which no other efficient implementation is known, such as identity-based encryption or attribute-based encryption schemes.

Pairing-based cryptography is used in the KZG cryptographic commitment scheme.

A contemporary example of using bilinear pairings is exemplified in the BLS digital signature scheme.

Pairing-based cryptography relies on hardness assumptions separate from e.g. the elliptic-curve cryptography, which is older and has been studied for a longer time.

Cryptanalysis 

In June 2012 the National Institute of Information and Communications Technology (NICT), Kyushu University, and Fujitsu Laboratories Limited improved the previous bound for successfully computing a discrete logarithm on a supersingular elliptic curve from 676 bits to 923 bits.

In 2016, the Extended Tower Number Field Sieve algorithm allowed to reduced the complexity of finding discrete logarithm in some resulting groups of pairings. Thus, the security level of some pairing friendly elliptic curves have been later reduced.

References

External links
Lecture on Pairing-Based Cryptography
Ben Lynn's PBC Library

 
Elliptic curve cryptography